Jonathan Milan (born 1 October 2000) is an Italian professional track and road cyclist, who currently rides for UCI WorldTeam . He rode in the men's team pursuit event at the 2020 UCI Track Cycling World Championships in Berlin, Germany. He won the gold medal in the team pursuit at the 2020 Summer Olympics held at Tokyo in 2021, setting a new world record.

Major results

Road

2017
 1st Circuito di Orsago Juniors
 1st Coppa Montes
2018
 1st Circuito di Orsago Juniors
 1st Stage 1 Giro del Nordest d'Italia
2020
 1st  Time trial, National Under-23 Championships
 1st Stage 5 Giro Ciclistico d'Italia
 5th Time trial, UEC European Under-23 Championships
2022
 CRO Race
1st  Points classification
1st Stages 1 & 2
2023
 5th Overall Saudi Tour
1st Stage 2

Track

2020
 UEC European Championships
2nd  Individual pursuit
2nd  Team pursuit
3rd  Kilo
 2nd  Team pursuit, UEC European Under-23 Championships
 3rd  Team pursuit, UCI World Championships
2021
 1st  Team pursuit, Olympic Games
 UCI World Championships
1st  Team pursuit
2nd  Individual pursuit
 1st  Individual pursuit, UEC European Championships
2022
 UCI Nations Cup, Cali
1st Individual pursuit
1st Team pursuit
 UCI World Championships
2nd  Individual pursuit
2nd  Team pursuit
2023
 UEC European Championships
1st  Individual pursuit
1st  Team pursuit

World records

References

External links
 
 
 
 
 
 
 

2000 births
Living people
Italian male cyclists
People from Tolmezzo
Italian track cyclists
Olympic cyclists of Italy
Olympic gold medalists for Italy
Olympic medalists in cycling
Cyclists at the 2020 Summer Olympics
Medalists at the 2020 Summer Olympics
UCI Track Cycling World Champions (men)
Cyclists from Friuli Venezia Giulia